In fluid dynamics, a wind wave, water wave, or wind-generated water wave, is a surface wave that occurs on the free surface of bodies of water as a result of the wind blowing over the water's surface. The contact distance in the direction of the wind is known as the fetch. Waves in the oceans can travel thousands of kilometers before reaching land.

When directly generated and affected by local wind, a wind wave system is called a wind sea. Wind waves will travel in a great circle route after being generated – curving slightly left in the southern hemisphere and slightly right in the northern hemisphere.  After moving out of the area of fetch, wind waves are called swells and can travel thousands of kilometers. A noteworthy example of this is waves generated south of Tasmania during heavy winds that will travel across the Pacific to southern California, producing desirable surfing conditions. Swell consists of wind-generated waves that are not significantly affected by the local wind at that time. They have been generated elsewhere and sometimes previously. Wind waves in the ocean are also called ocean surface waves and are mainly gravity waves, where gravity is the main equilibrium force.

Wind waves have a certain amount of randomness: subsequent waves differ in height, duration, and shape with limited predictability. They can be described as a stochastic process, in combination with the physics governing their generation, growth, propagation, and decay – as well as governing the interdependence between flow quantities such as the water surface movements, flow velocities, and water pressure. The key statistics of wind waves (both seas and swells) in evolving sea states can be predicted with wind wave models.

Although waves are usually considered in the water seas of Earth, the hydrocarbon seas of Titan may also have wind-driven waves.

Formation

The great majority of large breakers seen at a beach result from distant winds. Five factors influence the formation of the flow structures in wind waves:
 Wind speed or strength relative to wave speed – the wind must be moving faster than the wave crest for energy transfer
 The uninterrupted distance of open water over which the wind blows without significant change in direction (called the fetch)
 Width of the area affected by fetch (at a right angle to the distance)
 Wind duration – the time for which the wind has blown over the water.
 Water depth
All of these factors work together to determine the size of the water waves and the structure of the flow within them.

The main dimensions associated with wave propagation are:
 Wave height (vertical distance from trough to crest)
 Wave length (distance from crest to crest in the direction of propagation)
 Wave period (time interval between arrival of consecutive crests at a stationary point)
 Wave direction or azimuth (predominantly driven by wind direction)

A fully developed sea has the maximum wave size theoretically possible for a wind of specific strength, duration, and fetch. Further exposure to that specific wind could only cause a dissipation of energy due to the breaking of wave tops and formation of "whitecaps". Waves in a given area typically have a range of heights. For weather reporting and for scientific analysis of wind wave statistics, their characteristic height over a period of time is usually expressed as significant wave height. This figure represents an average height of the highest one-third of the waves in a given time period (usually chosen somewhere in the range from 20 minutes to twelve hours), or in a specific wave or storm system. The significant wave height is also the value a "trained observer" (e.g. from a ship's crew) would estimate from visual observation of a sea state. Given the variability of wave height, the largest individual waves are likely to be somewhat less than twice the reported significant wave height for a particular day or storm.

Wave formation on an initially flat water surface by wind is started by a random distribution of normal pressure of turbulent wind flow over the water. This pressure fluctuation produces normal and tangential stresses in the surface water, which generates waves. It is assumed that:
 The water is originally at rest.
 The water is not viscous.
 The water is irrotational.
 There is a random distribution of normal pressure to the water surface from the turbulent wind.
 Correlations between air and water motions are neglected.

The second mechanism involves wind shear forces on the water surface. John W. Miles suggested a surface wave generation mechanism that is initiated by turbulent wind shear flows based on the inviscid Orr-Sommerfeld equation in 1957. He found the energy transfer from the wind to the water surface is proportional to the curvature of the velocity profile of the wind at the point where the mean wind speed is equal to the wave speed. Since the wind speed profile is logarithmic to the water surface, the curvature has a negative sign at this point. This relation shows the wind flow transferring its kinetic energy to the water surface at their interface.

Assumptions:
 two-dimensional parallel shear flow
 incompressible, inviscid water and wind
 irrotational water
 slope of the displacement of the water surface is small

Generally, these wave formation mechanisms occur together on the water surface and eventually produce fully developed waves.

For example, if we assume a flat sea surface (Beaufort state 0), and a sudden wind flow blows steadily across the sea surface, the physical wave generation process follows the sequence:

 Turbulent wind forms random pressure fluctuations at the sea surface. Ripples with wavelengths in the order of a few centimeters are generated by the pressure fluctuations. (The Phillips mechanism)
 The winds keep acting on the initially rippled sea surface causing the waves to become larger. As the waves grow, the pressure differences get larger causing the growth rate to increase. Finally, the shear instability expedites the wave growth exponentially. (The Miles mechanism)
 The interactions between the waves on the surface generate longer waves and the interaction will transfer wave energy from the shorter waves generated by the Miles mechanism to the waves which have slightly lower frequencies than the frequency at the peak wave magnitudes, then finally the waves will be faster than the crosswind speed (Pierson & Moskowitz).

Types

Three different types of wind waves develop over time:
 Capillary waves, or ripples, dominated by surface tension effects.
 Gravity waves, dominated by gravitational and inertial forces.
 Seas, raised locally by the wind.
 Swells, which have traveled away from where they were raised by the wind, and have to a greater or lesser extent dispersed.

Ripples appear on smooth water when the wind blows, but will die quickly if the wind stops. The restoring force that allows them to propagate is surface tension. Sea waves are larger-scale, often irregular motions that form under sustained winds. These waves tend to last much longer, even after the wind has died, and the restoring force that allows them to propagate is gravity. As waves propagate away from their area of origin, they naturally separate into groups of common direction and wavelength. The sets of waves formed in this manner are known as swells. The Pacific Ocean is 19,800km from Indonesia to the coast of Colombia and, based on an average wavelength of 76.5m, would have ~258,824 swells over that width.

Individual "rogue waves" (also called "freak waves", "monster waves", "killer waves", and "king waves") much higher than the other waves in the sea state can occur. In the case of the Draupner wave, its  height was 2.2 times the significant wave height. Such waves are distinct from tides, caused by the Moon and Sun's gravitational pull, tsunamis that are caused by underwater earthquakes or landslides, and waves generated by underwater explosions or the fall of meteorites—all having far longer wavelengths than wind waves.

The largest ever recorded wind waves are not rogue waves, but standard waves in extreme sea states.

Spectrum

Ocean waves can be classified based on: the disturbing force that creates them; the extent to which the disturbing force continues to influence them after formation; the extent to which the restoring force weakens or flattens them; and their wavelength or period. Wind waves (deep-water waves) have a period of about 20 seconds.

The speed of all ocean waves is controlled by gravity, wavelength, and water depth. Most characteristics of ocean waves depend on the relationship between their wavelength and water depth. Wavelength determines the size of the orbits of water molecules within a wave, but water depth determines the shape of the orbits. The paths of water molecules in a wind wave are circular only when the wave is traveling in deep water. A wave cannot "feel" the bottom when it moves through water deeper than half its wavelength because too little wave energy is contained in the small circles below that depth. Waves moving through water deeper than half their wavelength are known as deep-water waves. On the other hand, the orbits of water molecules in waves moving through shallow water are flattened by the proximity of the sea surface bottom. Waves in water shallower than 1/20 their original wavelength are known as shallow-water waves. Transitional waves travel through water deeper than 1/20 their original wavelength but shallower than half their original wavelength.

In general, the longer the wavelength, the faster the wave energy will move through the water. The relationship between the wavelength, period and velocity of any wave is:

where C is speed (celerity), L is the wavelength, and T is time, or period (in seconds).  Thus the speed of the wave derives from the functional dependence  of the wavelength on the period (the dispersion relation).

The speed of a deep-water wave may also be approximated by:

Because g and π (3.14) are constants, the equation can be reduced to:

when C is measured in meters per second and L in meters. Note that in both formulas the wave speed is proportional to the square root of the wavelength.

The speed of shallow-water waves is described by a different equation that may be written as:

where C is speed (in meters per second), g is the acceleration due to gravity, and d is the depth of the water (in meters). The period of a wave remains unchanged regardless of the depth of water through which it is moving. As deep-water waves enter the shallows and feel the bottom, however, their speed is reduced, and their crests "bunch up," so their wavelength shortens.

Spectral models
Sea state can be described by the sea wave spectrum or just wave spectrum . It is composed of a wave height spectrum (WHS)  and a wave direction spectrum (WDS) . Many interesting properties about the sea state can be found from the wave spectra.

WHS describes the spectral density of wave height variance ("power") versus wave frequency, with dimension .
The relationship between the spectrum  and the wave amplitude  for a wave component  is:
 
Some WHS models are listed below. 
 The International Towing Tank Conference (ITTC)  recommended spectrum model for fully developed sea (ISSC spectrum/modified Pierson-Moskowitz spectrum):
 
 ITTC recommended spectrum model for limited fetch (JONSWAP spectrum)
 
where
 
 
(The latter model has since its creation improved based on the work of Phillips and Kitaigorodskii to better model the wave height spectrum for high wavenumbers.)

As for WDS, an example model of  might be:
 

Shoaling and refraction

As waves travel from deep to shallow water, their shape changes (wave height increases, speed decreases, and length decreases as wave orbits become asymmetrical). This process is called shoaling.

Wave refraction is the process that occurs when waves interact with the sea bed to slow the velocity of propagation as a function of wavelength and period. As the waves slow down in shoaling water, the crests tend to realign at a decreasing angle to the depth contours. Varying depths along a wave crest cause the crest to travel at different phase speeds, with those parts of the wave in deeper water moving faster than those in shallow water. This process continues while the depth decreases, and reverses if it increases again, but the wave leaving the shoal area may have changed direction considerably. Rays—lines normal to wave crests between which a fixed amount of energy flux is contained—converge on local shallows and shoals. Therefore, the wave energy between rays is concentrated as they converge, with a resulting increase in wave height.

Because these effects are related to a spatial variation in the phase speed, and because the phase speed also changes with the ambient current – due to the Doppler shift – the same effects of refraction and altering wave height also occur due to current variations. In the case of meeting an adverse current the wave steepens, i.e. its wave height increases while the wavelength decreases, similar to the shoaling when the water depth decreases.

Breaking

Some waves undergo a phenomenon called "breaking". A breaking wave is one whose base can no longer support its top, causing it to collapse. A wave breaks when it runs into shallow water, or when two wave systems oppose and combine forces. When the slope, or steepness ratio, of a wave, is too great, breaking is inevitable.

Individual waves in deep water break when the wave steepness—the ratio of the wave height H to the wavelength λ—exceeds about 0.17, so for H > 0.17 λ. In shallow water, with the water depth small compared to the wavelength, the individual waves break when their wave height H is larger than 0.8 times the water depth h, that is H > 0.8 h. Waves can also break if the wind grows strong enough to blow the crest off the base of the wave.

In shallow water, the base of the wave is decelerated by drag on the seabed. As a result, the upper parts will propagate at a higher velocity than the base and the leading face of the crest will become steeper and the trailing face flatter. This may be exaggerated to the extent that the leading face forms a barrel profile, with the crest falling forward and down as it extends over the air ahead of the wave.

Three main types of breaking waves are identified by surfers or surf lifesavers. Their varying characteristics make them more or less suitable for surfing and present different dangers.
 Spilling, or rolling: these are the safest waves on which to surf. They can be found in most areas with relatively flat shorelines. They are the most common type of shorebreak. The deceleration of the wave base is gradual, and the velocity of the upper parts does not differ much with height. Breaking occurs mainly when the steepness ratio exceeds the stability limit.
 Plunging, or dumping: these break suddenly and can "dump" swimmers—pushing them to the bottom with great force. These are the preferred waves for experienced surfers. Strong offshore winds and long wave periods can cause dumpers. They are often found where there is a sudden rise in the seafloor, such as a reef or sandbar. Deceleration of the wave base is sufficient to cause upward acceleration and a significant forward velocity excess of the upper part of the crest. The peak rises and overtakes the forward face, forming a "barrel" or "tube" as it collapses.
 Surging: these may never actually break as they approach the water's edge, as the water below them is very deep. They tend to form on steep shorelines. These waves can knock swimmers over and drag them back into deeper water. 
When the shoreline is near vertical, waves do not break but are reflected. Most of the energy is retained in the wave as it returns to seaward. Interference patterns are caused by superposition of the incident and reflected waves, and the superposition may cause localized instability when peaks cross, and these peaks may break due to instability. (see also clapotic waves)

Physics of waves

Wind waves are mechanical waves that propagate along the interface between water and air; the restoring force is provided by gravity, and so they are often referred to as surface gravity waves. As the wind blows, pressure and friction perturb the equilibrium of the water surface and transfer energy from the air to the water, forming waves. The initial formation of waves by the wind is described in the theory of Phillips from 1957, and the subsequent growth of the small waves has been modeled by Miles, also in 1957.

In linear plane waves of one wavelength in deep water, parcels near the surface move not plainly up and down but in circular orbits: forward above and backward below (compared to the wave propagation direction). As a result, the surface of the water forms not an exact sine wave, but more a trochoid with the sharper curves upwards—as modeled in trochoidal wave theory. Wind waves are thus a combination of transversal and longitudinal waves.

When waves propagate in shallow water, (where the depth is less than half the wavelength) the particle trajectories are compressed into ellipses.

In reality, for finite values of the wave amplitude (height), the particle paths do not form closed orbits; rather, after the passage of each crest, particles are displaced slightly from their previous positions, a phenomenon known as Stokes drift.

As the depth below the free surface increases, the radius of the circular motion decreases. At a depth equal to half the wavelength λ, the orbital movement has decayed to less than 5% of its value at the surface. The phase speed (also called the celerity) of a surface gravity wave is – for pure periodic wave motion of small-amplitude waves – well approximated by

where
c = phase speed;
λ = wavelength;
d = water depth;
g = acceleration due to gravity at the Earth's surface.

In deep water, where , so  and the hyperbolic tangent approaches , the speed  approximates

This expression tells us that waves of different wavelengths travel at different speeds. The fastest waves in a storm are the ones with the longest wavelength. As a result, after a storm, the first waves to arrive on the coast are the long-wavelength swells.

For intermediate and shallow water, the Boussinesq equations are applicable, combining frequency dispersion and nonlinear effects. And in very shallow water, the shallow water equations can be used.

If the wavelength is very long compared to the water depth, the phase speed (by taking the limit of  when the wavelength approaches infinity) can be approximated by

On the other hand, for very short wavelengths, surface tension plays an important role and the phase speed of these gravity-capillary waves can (in deep water) be approximated by

where
S = surface tension of the air-water interface;
 = density of the water.

When several wave trains are present, as is always the case in nature, the waves form groups. In deep water, the groups travel at a group velocity which is half of the phase speed. Following a single wave in a group one can see the wave appearing at the back of the group, growing, and finally disappearing at the front of the group.

As the water depth  decreases towards the coast, this will have an effect: wave height changes due to wave shoaling and refraction. As the wave height increases, the wave may become unstable when the crest of the wave moves faster than the trough. This causes surf, a breaking of the waves.

The movement of wind waves can be captured by wave energy devices. The energy density (per unit area) of regular sinusoidal waves depends on the water density , gravity acceleration  and the wave height  (which, for regular waves, is equal to twice the amplitude):

The velocity of propagation of this energy is the group velocity.

Models

Surfers are very interested in the wave forecasts. There are many websites that provide predictions of the surf quality for the upcoming days and weeks. Wind wave models are driven by more general weather models that predict the winds and pressures over the oceans, seas, and lakes.

Wind wave models are also an important part of examining the impact of shore protection and beach nourishment proposals. For many beach areas there is only patchy information about the wave climate, therefore estimating the effect of wind waves is important for managing littoral environments.

A wind-generated wave can be predicted based on two parameters: wind speed at 10 m above sea level and wind duration, which must blow over long periods of time to be considered fully developed. The significant wave height and peak frequency can then be predicted for a certain fetch length.

Seismic signals

Ocean water waves generate land seismic waves that propagate hundreds of kilometers into the land. These seismic signals usually have a period of 6 ± 2 seconds. Such recordings were first reported and understood in about 1900.

There are two types of seismic "ocean waves". The primary waves are generated in shallow waters by direct water wave-land interaction and have the same period as the water waves (10 to 16 seconds). The more powerful secondary waves are generated by the superposition of ocean waves of equal period traveling in opposite directions, thus generating standing gravity waves – with an associated pressure oscillation at half the period, which is not diminishing with depth. The theory for microseism generation by standing waves was provided by Michael Longuet-Higgins in 1950 after in 1941 Pierre Bernard suggested this relation with standing waves on the basis of observations.

See also

References

Scientific

Other

External links

Current global map of peak wave periods
Current global map of significant wave heights

Coastal geography
Physical oceanography
 
Articles containing video clips
Oceanographical terminology
Surface waves